Gaelic type (sometimes called Irish character, Irish type, or Gaelic script) is a family of Insular script typefaces devised for printing Classical Gaelic. It was widely used from the 16th until the mid-18th century (Scotland) or the mid-20th century (Ireland) but is now rarely used. Sometimes, all Gaelic typefaces are called Celtic or uncial although most Gaelic types are not uncials. The "Anglo-Saxon" types of the 17th century are included in this category because both the Anglo-Saxon types and the Gaelic/Irish types derive from the insular manuscript hand.

The terms Gaelic type, Gaelic script and Irish character translate the Irish phrase . In Ireland, the term  is used in opposition to the term , Roman type.

(–1770) was one of the last Scottish writers with the ability to write in this script, but his main work, was published in the Roman script.

Characteristics

Besides the 26 letters of the Latin alphabet, Gaelic typefaces must include all vowels with acute accents  as well as a set of consonants with dot above , and the Tironian sign et , used for  'and' in Irish.

Lower-case  is drawn without a dot (though it is not the Turkish dotless ), and the letters  have insular shapes .

Many modern Gaelic typefaces include Gaelic letterforms for the letters , and typically provide support for at least the vowels of the other Celtic languages.

Origin

The Irish uncial alphabet originated in medieval manuscripts as an "insular" variant of the Latin alphabet. The first Gaelic typeface was designed in 1571 for a catechism commissioned by Elizabeth I to help attempt to convert the Irish Catholic population to Anglicanism.

Use
Typesetting in Gaelic script remained common in Ireland until the mid-20th century. Gaelic script is today used merely for decorative typesetting; for example, a number of traditional Irish newspapers still print their name in Gaelic script on the first page, and it is also popular for pub signs, greeting cards, and display advertising.

In 1996  created a new corporate logo. The logo consists of a modern take on the Gaelic type face. The R's counter is large with a short tail, the T is roman script while the E is curved but does not have a counter like a lower case E, and the letters also have slight serifs to them. TG4's original logo, under the brand , also used a modernization of the font, the use of the curved T and a sans-serif A in the word . The  uses Gaelic Script on its official seal.

The GAA logo uses the script to incorporate both the English language GAA acronym and the Irish language  acronym. The logo more strongly shows the more widely used acronym GAA but taking a closer look a C joins with an L and then to a G lying down.

In Unicode

Unicode treats the Gaelic script as a font variant of the Latin alphabet.

According to Michael Everson, in the 2006 Unicode proposal for these characters: 

Unicode 5.1 (2008) added a capital G (Ᵹ) and both capital and lowercase letters D, F, R, S, T, besides "turned insular G", on the basis that Edward Lhuyd used these letters in his 1707 work  as a scientific orthography for Cornish.

 Ꝺ ꝺ Insular D (U+A779, U+A77A)
 ◌ᷘ Combining Small Insular D (U+1DD8) (Used for Old Norse)
 Ꝼ ꝼ Insular F (U+A77B, U+A77C)
 Ᵹ ᵹ Insular G (U+A77D, U+1D79)
 Ꝿ ꝿ Turned insular G (U+A77E, U+A77F)
 Ꞃ ꞃ Insular R (U+A782, U+A783)
 Ꞅ ꞅ Insular S (U+A784, U+A785)
 Ꞇ ꞇ Insular T (U+A786, U+A787)

Unicode 14.0 (2021) added characters, including Insular letters, for the Ormulum:
 Ꟑ ꟑ Closed Insular G (U+A7D0, U+A7D1)
 ◌ᫌ Combining Insular G (U+1ACC)
 ◌ᫍ Combining Insular R (U+1ACD)
 ◌ᫎ Combining Insular T (U+1ACE)

Samples

Gallery

See also
 Blackletter
 Fraktur
 Irish orthography
 ISO/IEC 8859-14
 Theobald Stapleton (who devised an Antiqua orthography for Irish in 1639)

References

Sources
 Lynam, E. W. 1969. The Irish character in print: 1571–1923. New York: Barnes & Noble. First printed as Oxford University Press offprint 1924 in Transactions of the Bibliographical Society, 4th Series, Vol. IV, No. 4, March 1924.)
 McGuinne, Dermot. Irish type design: A history of printing types in the Irish character. Blackrock: Irish Academic Press.

External links
 Brendan Leen's Four centuries of printing in the Irish character, Cregan Library, St Patrick's College, Drumcondra
 Vincent Morley's An Cló Gaelach (in Irish)
 Mícheál Ó Searcóid's The Irish Alphabet, an article on the origin, history and present-day usage of the Irish typeface, 1990
 Mathew D. Staunton's Trojan Horses and Friendly Faces: Irish Gaelic Typography as Propaganda. La revue LISA. . Vol. III; n°1. 2005.
 Bunchló GC (in Irish), a Gaelic modern minuscule font in Unicode for non-commercial use.
 Glanchló GC (in Irish), a Gaelic type font in Unicode for non-commercial use.
 Gadelica, a Gaelic traditional minuscule font in Unicode.
 More information about Gaelic fonts

Irish language
Latin-script typefaces